The final of the women's 800 metre freestyle event at the 1984 Summer Olympics was held at the McDonald's Olympic Swim Stadium in Los Angeles, California, on August 3, 1984.

Records
Prior to this competition, the existing world and Olympic records were as follows.

The following records were established during the competition:

Results

Heats
Rule: The eight fastest swimmers advance to final A (Q).

Final

References

External links
 Official Report
 USA Swimming

F
1984 in women's swimming
Women's events at the 1984 Summer Olympics